Lady Augusta De Ameland (born Murray; 27 January 1761 – 4 March 1830) was the first wife of Prince Augustus Frederick, Duke of Sussex, the sixth son of George III. They married on 4 April 1793 in Rome. Their union was in contravention of the Royal Marriages Act 1772 because the Prince had not asked his father's permission, so she was not recognised as his wife.

Early life

Lady Augusta was born in Scotland. Her father was John Murray, 4th Earl of Dunmore and her mother was Lady Charlotte Stewart, a younger daughter of Alexander Stewart, 6th Earl of Galloway.

Marriage
Lady Augusta secretly married Prince Augustus Frederick, sixth son of King George III, on 4 April 1793 in a Church of England ceremony in her lodgings at Hotel Sarmiento, Rome. They were married again on 5 December 1793 in St George's, Hanover Square, London, using their correct names but without revealing their full identities. Both marriage ceremonies were outside the terms of the Royal Marriages Act 1772 and were annulled in July 1794. Therefore, when the prince was ennobled as Duke of Sussex in 1801, she could not use the title Duchess of Sussex.

The couple had two children:
Augustus Frederick d'Este (13 January 1794 – 28 December 1848)
Augusta Emma d'Este, later Lady Truro (9 August 1801 – 21 May 1866), who married Thomas Wilde, 1st Baron Truro of Bowes on 13 August 1845

Later life
Prince Augustus tried to have his marriage to Lady Augusta recognised for many years, but eventually, he separated from her.  On 27 November 1801, the King created him, Duke of Sussex, Earl of Inverness, and Baron Arklow. In 1806, Lady Augusta was given royal licence to use the surname De Ameland instead of Murray. 

She was granted a pension of £4,000 per annum and bought a house in Ramsgate where she created a small estate. Augusta died on 4 March 1830 and is buried in the D'Este mausoleum in the churchyard at St Lawrence in Thanet.

After Lady Augusta's death, the Duke of Sussex married Lady Cecilia Underwood.

References

External links
A "book of cures" by Lady Augusta Murray in the Royal Collection

1761 births
1830 deaths
Daughters of Scottish earls
Augusta Murray, Lady
Augusta
People from London